Streptomyces aureoverticillatus is a bacterium species from the genus of Streptomyces which has been isolated from soil. Streptomyces aureoverticillatus produces Aureoverticillactam.

See also 
 List of Streptomyces species

References

Further reading

External links
Type strain of Streptomyces aureoverticillatus at BacDive -  the Bacterial Diversity Metadatabase

aureoverticillatus
Bacteria described in 1970